El Amin Chentouf, (Arabic: الأمين شنتوف) (born 9 June 1981) is a Moroccan para-athlete running in T12 distance races. He has represented his country at three Summer Paralympics winning gold medals at each competition. Outside the Paralympics, Chentouf is also a world series Marathon champion, winning the T12/13 event at three London Marathons.

Personal history
Chentouf was born in Morocco in 1981. He is visually impaired.

Career history
Chentouf took up athletics in 2008. He made his senior international debut at the 2012 Summer Paralympics in London. He entered into three events, the 800m and 5,000m at T12 classifications and the 1,500m T13 race. He reached the podium in the 5,000m, taking gold with a world record breaking time of 13:53.76.

The following year he entered the IPC Athletics Marathon World Cup in London, his first competitive international marathon. He won the race in a time of 2:24:00, setting another world record in the T12 class. The same year he represented Morocco at the 2013 IPC Athletics World Championships in Lyon, Chentouf won gold medals in all three of his events, the 1500m, 5000m and the marathon.

Two years later, in the buildup to the 2016 Summer Paralympics in Rio de Janeiro, he took part in the inaugural IPC World Marathon Championships held in London. There he won the men's T11/T12 race with a time of 2:21.33. Later in the year he took part in his second World Championships, this time held in Doha. He failed to dominate the field as he had done so at Lyon, but he did win the bronze in the 1500 metres (T13). In Rio Chentouf cemented his reputation as one of the great distance runners in his class, by winning the men's marathon and taking the silver medal in the 5000 metres.

External links 

 Video of the final 5000 meters men's T12 World Championships 2013 wheelchair athletics, official channel of the International Paralympic Committee.
 Video of the final 10,000 meters men's T12 World Para-Athletics 2013 Championships, official channel of the International Paralympic Committee.

References 

1981 births
Living people
Paralympic athletes of Morocco
Visually impaired category Paralympic competitors
Athletes (track and field) at the 2012 Summer Paralympics
Athletes (track and field) at the 2016 Summer Paralympics
Paralympic gold medalists for Morocco
Paralympic silver medalists for Morocco
Moroccan male long-distance runners
Medalists at the 2012 Summer Paralympics
Medalists at the 2016 Summer Paralympics
Paralympic gold medalists in athletics (track and field)
Moroccan people with disabilities